The Movement for Democracy in Liberia (MODEL) was a rebel group in Liberia that became active in March 2003, launching attacks from Ivory Coast. MODEL was based on the Force Spéciale pour la Libération du Monde Africain (LIMA) militia formed in September 2002 to help Laurent Gbagbo's government against insurgents backed by Liberia's president Charles Taylor. After fighting off the imminent threat, parts of LIMA crossed the border to Liberia to continue the war there. With Taylor's forces already pressed against the larger Liberians United for Reconciliation and Democracy (LURD), MODEL achieved rapid territorial gains. While it was initially thought that MODEL was a splinter group of LURD, this was not the case. While the initial leadership of MODEL came from LURD, the majority of MODEL fighters were mobilized from Ivorian and Ghanaian refugee camps to which many Liberians from the country's Southeast had fled to. 

The relationship between the rebel groups too was strained, with politicians from both movements trying to make certain that cooperation would remain difficult. MODEL was backed by the Ivorian government as a way of staking a claim in Liberian politics during the turmoil of that country's civil war, or as retaliation for the Liberian government's alleged support for rebels in Ivory Coast. Its political leader, Thomas Nimely, was named as Liberia's foreign minister in the transitional government that was appointed on October 14, 2003, following the resignation and exile of Taylor.  The group may have exported timber from regions of southern Liberia under its control, which would have been a violation of United Nations sanctions. By 2004 MODEL in effect ceased to exist.

References

External links
Voice of America, Nimely denies becoming involved in Ivory Coast's 2010 election crisis

History of Liberia
Rebel groups in Liberia
Military units and formations established in 2003
2003 establishments in Liberia